Limoeiro is a city in Pernambuco, Brazil.

Geography
 State - Pernambuco
 Region - Agreste Pernambucano
 Boundaries - Vicência   (N);  Passira and Feira Nova  (S);  Carpina, Lagoa do Carro and Buenos Aires   (E); Bom Jardim, Salgadinho and João Alfredo   (W)
 Area - 269.97 km2
 Elevation - 138 m
 Hydrography - Capibaribe and Goiana rivers
 Vegetation - Caducifólia forest
 Climate - hot, tropical, and humid
 Annual average temperature - 25.1 c
 Distance to Recife - 91 km

Economy

The main economic activities in Limoeiro are based in industry, commerce, tourism and agribusiness; especially plantations of bananas and sugarcane, and the raising of cattle, goats, sheep, pigs and chickens.

Economic indicators

Economy by sector (2006)

Health indicators

References

External links

Municipalities in Pernambuco